Mowalola Ogunlesi (born March 25, 1995) is a Nigerian-born fashion designer and singer working and living in London. She is known for working with a wide variety of textiles such as leather and PVC to produce non-traditional silhouettes inspired by Nigerian and London youth culture.

Early life
Ogunlesi was born to two Nigerian fashion designers, her mother, Adenike Ogunlesi of Ruff 'n' Tumble specializing in children's clothing and her father working in traditional Nigerian menswear. At the age of 12, Ogunlesi moved from Nigeria to attend boarding school in the Surrey countryside. Ogunlesi earned her Bachelor of Arts in Fashion at Central Saint Martins - University of the Arts London, debuting a collection at the Graduation Press Show in 2017. She enrolled in the Master of Arts programme at Central Saint Martins that year but dropped out in 2018 to have more creative freedom in her work.

Career and recognition 
After leaving Central Saint Martins, Ogunlesi applied to the Fashion East mentorship and support programme. Her 2019 London Fashion Week debut took place on Fashion East's stage.

Ogunlesi came under scrutiny in September 2019 when Naomi Campbell was spotted wearing a Mowalola gown with a bullet wound design. The dress was interpreted as a statement on gun violence, but on Instagram Ogunlesi clarified the garment was meant to convey a sense of being a walking target.

Ogunlesi has attracted the attention of artists like Drake, Solange, Steve Lacy, Kelela and Kanye West.

In October 2020, Ogunlesi was named by Elle as one of "10 Trailblazing Women Changing The Future You Need To Know", the others being: Tobi Kyeremateng, Ngozi Onwurah, Simi Lindgren, Balanda Atis, Magdalene Abraha, Koffee, Holly Fischer, Celeste and Margaret Busby.

Collaborations 
In 2019, she created outfits for Skepta's "Pure Water" music video and was one of six designers approached by British Vogue to style Barbie dolls for the brand's 60th anniversary.

On June 26, 2020 the Yeezy GAP 10-year partnership was officially announced, with Ogunlesi appointed by West as Design Director.

In 2022, she joined with MGA Entertainment as a designer for a line of their Bratz dolls featuring two of the doll franchise's characters: Jade and Felicia. The collaboration line is set to be released in fall.

Music 
Ogunlesi releases music also under the name Mowalola. In 2021, she released two singles, "Truck" and "Wawa". She was later featured on Namasenda's single "Banana Clip".

References 

1995 births
Living people
Nigerian fashion designers
Yoruba fashion designers
Yoruba women in business
Nigerian fashion businesspeople
Alumni of Central Saint Martins
Nigerian women in business
Black British fashion people
Nigerian women fashion designers